ABC Warehouse, Inc. or ABC Appliance, Inc. is a chain of retail appliance and electronics stores based in Pontiac, Michigan. It was founded in 1963 by Gordon Hartunian, and operates 42 stores in Michigan, Ohio and Indiana. The chain also operates 16 Mickey Shorr Mobile Electronics stores  and 2 Hawthorne Home Appliances & Electronics stores. They are known for their advertising motto "The Closest Thing To Wholesale". In the last few years ABC has added mattresses and furniture to their retail offerings, including products from Sealy & Lane.

History
Gordon Hartunian opened the first ABC Warehouse store in a former warehouse in Center Line, Michigan. By 1980, he had opened a second store in Pontiac and a third in Flint. Hartunian was previously employed by another appliance store called Hot & Cold, which closed all of its Detroit stores.

ABC Warehouse was one of the 30 consumer electronics retailers selected in 2007 to participate in an IBM program that tracked metrics on consumer application requests based on data provided by the NTIA. In 2009, General Electric signed a financial contract with the chain to provide the in house ABC credit card.

Advertising
In the 1980s, ABC Warehouse used Ernest P. Worrell in its television advertising. Children were offered a paper Ernest mask in the store. 

In the 1990s, ABC commercials featured "The ABC Warehouse Employees Choir" who sung their own songs like "Price Protection" (sung to the tune of Alouette). 

From the late 90s to the late 2000s, ABC featured their founder Gordon "Gordy" Hartunian in a series of ads called "Gordyisms".

References

External links
 

Retail companies established in 1963
Consumer electronics retailers in the United States
Companies based in Oakland County, Michigan
Pontiac, Michigan
1963 establishments in Michigan